PTT Stadium (known as Mabka Stadium) is a football stadium located in Rayong, Thailand, with a capacity of 12,000. The name of the ground changed due to sponsorship agreements with PTT Public Company Limited.

References

External links
 Stadium information

Football venues in Thailand
Buildings and structures in Rayong province